Verkhny (Ürge) is a rural locality (a khutor) in Shingak-Kulsky Selsoviet, Chishminsky District, Bashkortostan, Russia. The population was 398 as of 2010. There are 5 streets.

Geography 
Verkhny is located 40 km southwest of Chishmy (the district's administrative centre) by road. Nizhny is the nearest rural locality.

References 

Rural localities in Chishminsky District